Jill Craybas and Olga Govortsova were the defending champions, but chose not to participate this year.

Lucie Hradecká and Renata Voráčová won in the final 2–6, 6–3, 12–10 against Julia Görges and Patty Schnyder.

Seeds

Draw

Draw

External links
 Draw

Istanbul Cup
İstanbul Cup